Nikolai Iosifovich Konrad (13 March 1891 – 30 September 1970) was a Soviet philologist and historian, described in the Great Soviet Encyclopedia as "the founder of the Soviet school of Japanese scholars".

Life
Konrad was born in Riga to a German father who was a railway engineer while his mother was the daughter of a priest from the Oryol Governorate. He studied at the Oriental Faculty of Saint Petersburg University, attending lectures by Lev Sternberg at the Museum of Anthropology and Ethnography. After graduation he traveled to Japan and Korea, studying the languages and undertaking ethnographic study. World War I prevented his return to Russia until 1917.

Konrad then taught at Leningrad University, and became professor of Japanese language and literature there from 1922 to 1939. He knew Mikhail Bakhtin in the 1920s, and Bakhtin later cited Konrad, Dmitry Likhachov and Juri Lotman as the three most important Russian literary theorists.

After his fellow scholar Nikolai Nevsky and his wife were arrested on charges of spying, Konrad found their two-year-old daughter left in their apartment; he brought the girl up as his own after her parents' execution. In 1941 he became professor at the Moscow Institute of Oriental Studies.

Awards and honors 

 Two Orders of Lenin (June 10, 1945; March 27, 1954)
 Two Orders of the Red Banner of Labour
 Order of the Rising Sun, 2nd class (1969)
 USSR State Prize

Works
 Zapad i Vostok (West and East), Moscow, 1966. Translated by H. Kasanina and others as West-East, inseparable twain; selected articles. Moscow, 1967

References

1891 births
1970 deaths
20th-century Russian male writers
Scientists from Riga
Full Members of the USSR Academy of Sciences
Academic staff of the Moscow Institute of Oriental Studies
Academic staff of Saint Petersburg State University
Recipients of the Order of Lenin
Recipients of the Order of the Red Banner of Labour
Recipients of the Order of the Rising Sun, 2nd class
Recipients of the USSR State Prize
Japanese literature academics
Translators to Russian
Russian Japanologists
Russian literary critics
Russian orientalists
Russian sinologists
Soviet literary critics
Soviet orientalists
Soviet sinologists
Burials at Novodevichy Cemetery